American River Bank is a community bank founded in 1983, by Robert H. Daneke, who served as first president and CEO,  and serves the Greater Sacramento area in California. As of 2019, It operates ten branches in Northern CA. American River Bank which offers both business and personal financial services and is a wholly owned subsidiary of American River Bankshares.

History 
American River Bank was founded in Fair Oaks, California by Robert H. Daneke who served as first President and CEO and William Young. Throughout its history it acquired several banks, such as the North Coast Bank, Bank of Amador, as well as the Placer Bank of Commerce. In October 2005, it opened up its sixth branch located in  Rancho Cordova, California. The bank ended last year with $563.2 million in assets, down 1.8 percent from $573.7 million in 2007.

The company was acquired by Nasdaq-listed Bank of Marin Bancorp on August 6, 2021, in an all stock deal with American River being delisted from the Nasdaq.

References

External links 
 
 

Banks based in California
1983 establishments in California
Banks established in 1983
American companies established in 1983
Companies formerly listed on the Nasdaq